Wentian Li is a bioinformatician. He is co-editor-in-chief of Computational Biology and Chemistry and member of the editorial board of the Journal of Theoretical Biology.  Li is an   investigator at The Feinstein Institute for Medical Research.

Li received his BS in Physics from Beijing University in 1982 and PhD in Physics and Complex Systems from Columbia University in 1989.

References

Living people
Year of birth missing (living people)
Chinese bioinformaticians
Academic journal editors
Peking University alumni
Columbia University alumni